In mathematics, the Marcinkiewicz–Zygmund inequality, named after Józef Marcinkiewicz and Antoni Zygmund, gives relations between moments of a collection of independent random variables. It is a generalization of the rule for the sum of variances of independent random variables to moments of arbitrary order. It is a special case of the Burkholder-Davis-Gundy inequality in the case of discrete-time martingales.

Statement of the inequality

The second-order case

See also
Several similar moment inequalities are known as Khintchine inequality and Rosenthal inequalities, and there are also extensions to more general symmetric statistics of independent random variables.

Notes

Statistical inequalities
Probabilistic inequalities
Probability theorems
Theorems in functional analysis